Singal is a surname. Notable people with the surname include:

 George Z. Singal (born 1945), American jurist
 Jesse Singal, American journalist
 Henna Singal (born 1984), Indian singer

See also
 Singal-dong, province of South Korea